John James "Honest John"  Patterson (August 8, 1830September 28, 1912) was a businessman and United States Senator from South Carolina. He was a Republican.

Biography
Born and raised in Waterloo, a populated place in Juniata County, Pennsylvania, he attended public schools and then Jefferson College in Canonsburg. During the 1850s he engaged in newspaper and banking businesses in Pennsylvania; he published the Juniata Sentinel in 1852 and in 1853 became editor and part owner of the Harrisburg Telegraph in Harrisburg, the state capital. He first entered politics in 1859 when he was elected to the Pennsylvania House of Representatives, in which he served until 1861 when the Civil War began. 

He joined the United States Army and served as a captain in the Fifteenth U.S. (regular) Infantry. He also ran for a seat in the United States House of Representatives in 1862, but lost.

After the war Patterson moved to Columbia, South Carolina and engaged in railroad construction. He again entered politics and in 1873 was elected by the South Carolina Legislature to the U.S. Senate as a Republican. 

He was criticized by the Ku Klux Klan in South Carolina for being a so-called "carpetbagger". Patterson was the chairman of the Committee on Education and Labor from 1875 to 1877 and a member of the committee on territories from 1877 to 1879.  He was known for speaking out against events such as the Hamburg Massacre and supporting the rights of African-Americans in South Carolina. By the time his term ended in 1879, Reconstruction had ended and the Democrats had taken nearly all power in South Carolina, so Patterson had no hope of reelection. 

After leaving the Senate he continued to live in Washington, D.C. and engaged in financial enterprises. In 1886, he moved to Mifflintown, Pennsylvania where he lived until his death. He continued to be active in business, particularly in running a company that installed electric lightbulbs. He died on September 28, 1912. He is buried in the Westminster Presbyterian Cemetery.

Notes

References

External links
 

The Political Graveyard
  

1830 births
1912 deaths
South Carolina Republicans
19th-century American newspaper editors
Members of the Pennsylvania House of Representatives
Washington & Jefferson College alumni
Republican Party United States senators from South Carolina
People from Juniata County, Pennsylvania
19th-century American politicians
Journalists from Pennsylvania